George Pinchard (17 June 1871 – 29 December 1947) was a British sports shooter. He competed in the men's trap event at the 1912 Summer Olympics.

References

1871 births
1947 deaths
British male sport shooters
Olympic shooters of Great Britain
Shooters at the 1912 Summer Olympics
Sportspeople from Cambridge